The Scottish Uniroyal Tournament was a golf tournament that was played from 1969 to 1975. It was a 72-hole stroke-play event, played in Scotland. In 1976 and 1977 Uniroyal sponsored a European Tour event, the Uniroyal International.

Winners

After 1975 a 36-hole event was held, won by John Chillas in 1976, Bill Murray in 1977 and Bob Jamieson in 1978.

References

Golf tournaments in Scotland
Recurring sporting events established in 1969
Recurring sporting events disestablished in 1975
1969 establishments in Scotland
1975 disestablishments in Scotland